Snake species found in Jordan (45 species) include:

Bibliography 

Jordan
Snakes
Jordan, Snakes